Patmos Peak is the peak rising to 2044 m in the southern portion of Bastien Range in Ellsworth Mountains, Antarctica. The feature has steep and partly ice-free east and south slopes, and surmounts Nimitz Glacier and its tributary Karasura Glacier to the northeast, and upper Minnesota Glacier to the southwest.

The peak is named after the medieval fortress of Patmos in Southern Bulgaria.

Location
US mapping in 1961 and 1988.

See also
 Mountains in Antarctica

Maps
 Vinson Massif.  Scale 1:250 000 topographic map.  Reston, Virginia: US Geological Survey, 1988.
 Antarctic Digital Database (ADD). Scale 1:250000 topographic map of Antarctica. Scientific Committee on Antarctic Research (SCAR). Since 1993, regularly updated.

Notes

References
 Patmos Peak SCAR Composite Gazetteer of Antarctica
 Bulgarian Antarctic Gazetteer Antarctic Place-names Commission (in Bulgarian)
 Basic data (in English)

External links
 Patmos Peak. Copernix satellite image

Ellsworth Mountains
Bulgaria and the Antarctic
Mountains of Ellsworth Land